Zefir (Ukrainian: Зефір, Lithuanian: Zefyras, may also be spelled zephyr or zephir) is a type of soft confectionery made by whipping fruit and berry purée (mostly apple puree) with sugar and egg whites with subsequent addition of a gelling agent like pectin, carrageenan, agar, or gelatine. It is produced in the countries of the former Soviet Union. The name given after the Greek god of the light west wind Zephyr symbolizes its delicate airy consistency.

Zefir is derived from the traditional Russian pastila confectionery, but with added egg white foam and a gelling agent. 

The form typically resembles traditional meringue. However, in contrast to commercial-grade meringue, zefir is never crispy. In contrast to most chocolate-coated marshmallow-like confectioneries; zefirs normally come without layers of cookies/biscuits included. 

Zefir is usually milky white, may be rose-colored (with berries, cherry, strawberries and such), may have green dye if apple-flavored. Chocolate-coated kind of zefir are also a common, widespread version. A more unusual variation has fruit or berry jelly inside, and can also be covered in chocolate.

Zefir is comparable in its consistency to marshmallows or krembo.

See also

 List of chocolate-covered foods
 List of Russian desserts

References

External links

 Zephyr: Why is this favorite Russian dessert named after a Greek god?

Confectionery
Russian cuisine
Russian desserts
Ukrainian desserts
Chocolate-covered foods
Soviet cuisine
Meringue desserts